Sādhana is an ego-transcending spiritual practice. It includes a variety of disciplines from any culture like Hindu, Buddhist, Jain and Sikh traditions that are followed in order to achieve various spiritual or ritual objectives.

Sadhana is done for attaining detachment from worldly things, which can be a goal of a Sadhu. Karma yoga,  Bhakti yoga and Jñāna yoga can also be described as Sadhana, in that constant efforts to achieve maximum level of perfection in all streams in day-to-day life can be described as Sadhana.

Sādhana can also refer to a tantric liturgy or liturgical manual, that is, the instructions to carry out a certain practice.

Definitions
The historian N. Bhattacharyya provides a working definition of the benefits of sādhana as follows:

B. K. S. Iyengar (1993: p. 22), in his English translation of and commentary to the Yoga Sutras of Patanjali, defines sādhana in relation to abhyāsa and kriyā:

Paths 
The term sādhana means "methodical discipline to attain desired knowledge or goal". Sadhana is also done for attaining detachment from worldly things which can be a goal, a person undertaking such a practice is known in Sanskrit as a sādhu (female sādhvi), sādhaka (female sādhakā) or yogi (Tibetan pawo; feminine yogini or dakini, Tibetan khandroma). The goal of sādhana is to attain some level of spiritual realization, which can be either enlightenment, pure love of God (prema), liberation (moksha) from the cycle of birth and death (saṃsāra), or a particular goal such as the blessings of a deity as in the Bhakti traditions.

Sādhana can involve meditation, chanting of mantra sometimes with the help of prayer beads, puja to a deity, yajña, and in very rare cases mortification of the flesh or tantric practices such as performing one's particular sādhana within a cremation ground.

Traditionally in some Hindu and Buddhist traditions in order to embark on a specific path of sādhana, a guru may be required to give the necessary instructions. This approach is typified by some Tantric traditions, in which initiation by a guru is sometimes identified as a specific stage of sādhana.  On the other hand, individual renunciates may develop their own spiritual practice without participating in organized groups.

Tantric sādhana 

The tantric rituals are called "sādhana". Some of the well known sādhana-s are:

 śāva sādhana (sādhanā done while visualizing sitting on a corpse).
 śmaśāna sādhana (sādhana done while visualizing being in a crematorium or cremation ground).
 pañca-muṇḍa sādhana (sādhana done while visualizing sitting on a seat of five skulls).

Buddhism 
In Vajrayāna Buddhism and the Nalanda tradition, there are fifteen major tantric sādhanas:
 Śūraṅgama/Sitātapatrā
 Nīlakaṇṭha
 Tārā
 Mahākāla
 Hayagrīva
 Amitābha
 Bhaiṣajyaguru/Akṣobhya
 Guhyasamāja
 Vajrayoginī/Vajravārāhī
 Heruka/Cakrasaṃvara
 Yamāntaka
 Kālacakra
 Hevajra
 Chöd
 Vajrapāṇi
Avalokiteśvara

Not within this list but a central sādhana in Vajrayana is that of Vajrasattva.

All of these are available in Tibetan form, many are available in Chinese and some are still extant in ancient Sanskrit manuscripts.

Kværne (1975: p. 164) in his extended discussion of sahajā, treats the relationship of sādhana to mandala thus:

See also 

 Chilla (retreat)
 Guru–shishya tradition
 Lojong
 Mahayana
 Transfer of merit
 Vedic chant
 Monasticism
 Samyama (Holding Together)

Notes 

Hindu practices
Buddhist meditation
Tibetan Buddhist practices
Spiritual practice